Ballendorf may refer to: 

Ballendorf, a municipality in the Alb-Donau district, in Baden-Württemberg, Germany
Dirk Ballendorf (1939–2013), American-born Guamanian historian and professor of Micronesian studies

See also
Bollendorf-Pont, a village in the commune of Berdorf, in eastern Luxembourg